The Ordnance Corps is a branch of the Pakistan Army, responsible for supplying combat units with weapons and ammunition, including procurement, manufacturing and maintenance.

The current colonel commandant of the corps is Syed Shahab Shahid.

Pakistan Ordnance Factory
Pakistan Ordnance Factory is situated in Wah Cantt, almost 40km away from the federal capital, Islamabad. It is one of the largest weapons producing factories in Pakistan.

Units
 76 Ordnance Unit
 77 Ordnance Unit
 84 Ordnance Unit
 87 Ordnance Unit
 89 Ordnance Unit
 97 Ordnance Unit
 102 Ordnance Unit
 103 Ordnance Unit
 106 Ordnance Unit
 108 Ordnance Unit
 126 Ordnance Unit
 135 Ordnance Unit

See also
 Pakistan Army Artillery Corps
 Pakistan Army Corps of Engineers
 Pakistan Army Medical Corps
 Pakistan Army Corps of Signals
 Pakistan Army Corps of Electrical and Mechanical Engineering

References

Ordnance
Military logistics